= AddSearch =

- Type: Private
- Industry: Search engine
- Founded: April 26, 2013; 13 years ago in Helsinki, Finland
- Founder: Antti Ala-Ilkka
- Headquarters: Helsinki, Finland
- Area served: Online
- Products: Site search engine, search API
- Website: addsearch.com

AddSearch is a Helsinki-based company providing a hosted site search service that allows its users to set up a site search engine with a search API.

== History ==
The company was founded in 2013 by Antti Ala-Ilkka, Mikko Nurminen and Pasi Ilola and is headquartered in Helsinki, Finland.

AddSearch was launched directly in competition to now-discontinued Google Site Search. AddSearch was built to allow simple customization control over search results from the site.

AddSearch is available for both large enterprises and bloggers and small websites, with price scaling up depending on the amount of content on the website.
